The following are chronological lists of judges and chief judges of the Maryland Court of Appeals, known since December 14, 2022 as the Supreme Court of Maryland.

List of chief judges

List of all judges
Benjamin Rumsey, 1778–1806
Benjamin Mackall IV 1778–1806
Thomas Jones, 1778–1806
Solomon Wright, 1778–1792
James Murray, 1778–1784
Richard Potts, 1801–1806
Littleton Dennis Jr., 1801–1806
John Thomson Mason, 1806–1806
Jeremiah Chase, 1806–1824
James Tilghman, 1806–1809
William Polk, 1806–1812
Richard Sprigg Jr., 1806
Joseph Hopper Nicholson, 1806–1817
John Mackall Gantt, 1806–1811
John Buchanan, 1806–1844
Richard Tilghman Earle, 1809–1834
John Johnson Sr., 1811–1821
John Done, 1812–1814
William Bond Martin, 1814–1835
Walter Dorsey, 1817–1823
John Stephen, 1822–1844
Stevenson Archer, 1823–1848
Thomas Beale Dorsey, 1824–1851
Ezekiel F. Chambers, 1834–1851
Ara Spence, 1835–1851
William B. Stone, 1844–1845
Samuel Middleton Semmes, 1844–1845
Alexander Contee Magruder, 1844–1851
Robert N. Martin, 1845–1851
William Frick, 1848–1851
John Carroll LeGrand, 1851–1861
John Bowers Eccleston, 1851–1860
William Hallam Tuck, 1851–1861
James Lawrence Bartol, 1857–1883
Brice Goldsborough, 1860–1867
Silas Morris Cochran, 1861–1866
Richard Bowie, 1861–1867; 1871–1881
Daniel Weisel, 1864–1867
Peter Wood Crain, 1867
James Augustus Stewart, 1867–1879
Richard H. Alvey, 1867–1893
Richard Grason, 1867–1882
John Mitchell Robinson, 1867–1896
Oliver Miller, 1867–1892
Madison Nelson, 1867–1870
George Brent, 1867–1881
William Pinkney Maulsby, 1870–1871
Richard Bowie, 1871–1881
Levin Thomas Handy Irving, 1879–1892
John Ritchie, 1881–1887
Daniel Randall Magruder, 1881
Frederick Stone, 1881–1890
George Yellott, 1882–1889
William Shepard Bryan, 1883–1898
James McSherry, 1887–1907
David Fowler, 1889–1905
John Parran Briscoe, 1890–1923
Henry Page, 1892–1908
Charles Boyle Roberts, 1892–1899
Andrew Hunter Boyd, 1893–1924
George Mitchell Russum, 1896–1897
James Alfred Pearce, 1897–1912
Samuel D. Schmucker, 1898–1911
James A. C. Bond, 1899
Isaac Thomas Jones, 1899–1907
Nicholas Charles Burke, 1905–1920
John G. Rogers, 1907
Winder Laird Henry, 1908–1909
William H. Thomas, 1907–1924
Glenn H. Worthington, 1908–1909
John R. Pattison, 1909–1934
Hammond Urner, 1909–1938
Henry Stockbridge Jr. 1911–1924
Albert Constable, 1912–1919
William H. Adkins, 1919–1934
T. Scott Offutt, 1920–1942
W. Mitchell Digges, 1923–1934
Carroll T. Bond, 1924–1943
Francis Neal Parke, 1924–1941
William C. Walsh, 1924–1926
D. Lindley Sloan, 1926–1944
Benjamin A. Johnson, 1934–1943
William Mason Shehan, 1934–1940
Walter J. Mitchell, 1934–1941
Edward S. Delaplaine, 1938–1956
Stephen R. Collins, 1940–1957
William H. Forsythe, 1941–1942
Ogle Marbury, 1941–1952
Ridgely P. Melvin, 1942–1945
C. Gus Grason, 1942–1951
Levin C. Bailey, 1943–1944
Rowland K. Adams, 1943–1944
Walter C. Capper, 1944
William L. Henderson, 1944–1964
Charles Markell, 1945–1952
Hall Hammond, 1952–1972
Simon E. Sobeloff, 1952–1954
Frederick W. Brune, 1954–1964
Stedman Prescott, 1956–1966
William R. Horney, 1957–1968
Charles C. Marbury, 1960–1969
C. Ferdinand Sybert, 1961–1965
Reuben Oppenheimer, 1964–1967
Wilson K. Barnes, 1964–1974
William J. McWilliams, 1965–1974
Thomas B. Finan, 1966–1972
Frederick J. Singley Jr. 1967–1977
Marvin H. Smith, 1968–1986
J. Dudley Digges, 1969–1982
Robert C. Murphy, 2nd Appellate Circuit, 1972–1996
Irving A. Levine, 1972–1978
John C. Eldridge, 5th Appellate Circuit, 1974–2003
William J. O'Donnell, 1974–1976
Charles E. Orth Jr., 1976–1980
Harry A. Cole, 1977–1991
Rita C. Davidson, 1979–1984
Lawrence F. Rodowsky, 3rd Appellate Circuit, 1980–2002
James F. Couch Jr., 1982–1987
John F. McAuliffe, 1985–1993
William H. Adkins II, 1986–1990
Albert T. Blackwell Jr., 1987–1990
Howard S. Chasanow, 4th Appellate Circuit, 1990–1999
Robert L. Karwacki, 1st Appellate Circuit, 1990–1998
Robert M. Bell, 6th Appellate Circuit, 1991–2013
Irma S. Raker, 7th Appellate Circuit, 1993–2008
Alan M. Wilner, 2nd Appellate Circuit, 1996–2007
Dale R. Cathell, 1st Appellate Circuit, 1998–2008
Glenn T. Harrell Jr., 4th Appellate Circuit, 1999–2015
Lynne A. Battaglia, 3rd Appellate Circuit, 2002–2016
Clayton Greene Jr., 5th Appellate Circuit, 2004–2019
Joseph F. Murphy Jr., 2nd Appellate Circuit, 2007–2011
Sally D. Adkins, 1st Appellate Circuit, 2008–2018
Mary Ellen Barbera, 7th Appellate Circuit, 2008–2021
Robert N. McDonald, 2nd Appellate Circuit, 2011–2022
Shirley M. Watts, 6th Appellate Circuit, 2013–
Michele D. Hotten, 4th Appellate Circuit, 2015–
Joseph M. Getty, 3rd Appellate Circuit, 2016–2022
Brynja McDivitt Booth, 1st Appellate Circuit, 2019–
Jonathan Biran, 5th Appellate Circuit, 2019–
Steven B. Gould, 7th Appellate Circuit, 2021–
Angela M. Eaves, 2nd Appellate Circuit, 2022–
Matthew J. Fader, 3rd Appellate Circuit, 2022–

References
List of all judges from the Maryland Archives
List of chief judges from the Maryland Archives

Maryland
Justices